Zinc finger protein 517 is a protein that in humans is encoded by the ZNF517 gene.

References

Further reading 

Human proteins